Orthurethra is a clade of air-breathing land snails, terrestrial pulmonate gastropod mollusks in the clade Stylommatophora.

In the taxonomy of the Gastropoda by Bouchet & Rocroi, 2005, Orthurethra is treated as an informal group and subclade of Stylommatophora.

In the revised taxonomy of 2017 this taxon is no longer supported and has been replaced by the infraorder Pupilloidei.

Superfamilies and families 
Superfamilies and families within the clade Orthurethra:

(Families that are exclusively fossil are indicated with a dagger †)
Superfamily Pupilloidea
 Achatinellidae Gulick, 1873
 Agardhiellidae Harl & Páll-Gergely, 2017
 Amastridae Pilsbry, 1910
 Argnidae Hudec, 1965
 Azecidae H. Watson, 1920
 Cerastidae Wenz, 1923
 Chondrinidae Steenberg, 1925
 Cochlicopidae Pilsbry, 1900 (1879)
† Cylindrellinidae
 Draparnaudiidae Solem, 1962
 Enidae B. B. Woodward, 1903 (1880)
 Fauxulidae Harl & Páll-Gergely, 2017
 Gastrocoptidae Pilsbry, 1918
 Lauriidae Steenberg, 1925
 Odontocycladidae Hausdorf, 1996
 Orculidae Pilsbry, 1918
 Pagodulinidae Pilsbry, 1924
 Partulidae Pilsbry, 1900
 Pleurodiscidae Wenz, 1923
 Pupillidae W. Turton, 1831
 Pyramidulidae Kennard & B. B. Woodward, 1914
 Spelaeoconchidae A. J. Wagner, 1928
 Spelaeodiscidae Steenberg, 1925
 Strobilopsidae Wenz, 1915
 Truncatellinidae Steenberg, 1925
 Valloniidae Morse, 1864
 Vertiginidae Fitzinger, 1833

References

 
Stylommatophora
Extant Cretaceous first appearances